The García Sola Reservoir is a reservoir located in the town of Castilblanco in the autonomous community of Extremadura, Spain.

History 
The reservoir was constructed in 1962.

See also
Castilblanco

External links
 Estado del Embalse de García de Sola
 Estado de los embalses de la cuenca del Guadiana
 Ficha de la Sociedad Española de Presas y Embalses
 Fotorreportaje del Embalse de García Sola

Reservoirs in Extremadura
Guadiana